Joseph Stephen Bartos, Jr. (November 18, 1926 – March 11, 1989) was an American football halfback and defensive back in the National Football League for the Washington Redskins.  He played college football at the United States Naval Academy.

1926 births
1989 deaths
Sportspeople from Lorain, Ohio
American football halfbacks
American football defensive backs
Navy Midshipmen football players
Washington Redskins players